Street food in South Korea has traditionally been seen as a part of popular culture in Korea. Historically, street food mainly included foods such as Eomuk, Bungeo-ppang and Tteok-bokki. Street food has been sold through many types of retail outlet, with new ones being developed over time. Recently, street food has seen a popular resurgence in South Korea, such as at the Night Market at Hangang Park, which is called "Bamdokkaebi Night Market"(밤도깨비야시장).

“Usually run by an ahjusshi (아저씨) or ahjumma (아줌마), or older men and women, these popular stalls have become an integral part of Korea’s infamous food culture…” (Deborah 2018).

History
There are many kinds of traditional street food in South Korea. For example, glutinous rice cake (called Chapssal-tteok) with buckwheat jelly, dalgona, which is a candy made from baking soda and sugar, a fish shaped bun with bean jam called Bungeo-ppang, roasted sweet potato, and Chinese pancakes with brown sugar filling (called Hotteok). The traditional street foods are most common in the winter season; in the summer season ice cream is more popular.

In the Joseon Dynasty street vendors began to form a base of economic activity in the low-income bracket around markets. After the Korean War street vendors prospered by serving refugees and the large numbers of U.S. troops. Street food's influences come from the Cheonggyecheon Stream, Itaewon, and Jongno districts. Street food has become an important part of food culture in South Korea.

After the Korean War, street food vendors made a huge impact on people who had a lower standard of living by providing them with affordable meals. It was in the 1300s when food stalls started to arise at the Joseon markets. Before the 1960s, most of the food sold at street stalls were jinppang (찐빵), steamed bread filled with red-bean paste, and  hoppang (호빵), steamed buns that could be filled with vegetables or meats. These traditional snacks could easily be called ‘the ancestors of Korean street food’, since they were passed down to Korea from Japan during the early 1900s (Deborah 2018). Foods such as jinppang and hoppang started to sell in food vendors in the 1960 and additional items like tteobokki and gimbap made their ways in the 1970s.

Contemporary development
In the past, hotteok, fish cake skewers, a fish-shaped bun, and other snack foods were usually street food. Nowadays jokbal, steak cubes and jajangmyeon are served as meals. So street food is sometimes referred to as a "moving restaurant."

There are issues with street vendors. First, there are concerns with the hygiene of street food, although street vendors have tried address this issue. Secondly, street vendors do not usually pay tax; although after government promises of financial assistance the vendors made a commitment to pay taxes, for example in Noryangjin district. A third issue relates to selling by squatters, usually elderly people, in subway stations, where it is illegal.

Street food in South Korea has become gentrified and diverse, much like other regional or national foods, for example: Chinese Tanghuru, Kebob's, Turkish ice cream, Chilean Churros, etc. Food ordered is served within 2–3 minutes. Street foods are intended to be visually appealing as well as delicious, and the preparation can be an entertainment in itself, for example watching a vendor's hands as they roast the ingredients on an iron plate.

There are some festivals related to street food: for example, the Night Market at Hangang Park and university festivals. In addition, with the advent of the steak cube, an era of luxury street food has begun.

Forms of street food
 Food truck: Recently, food trucks have become a new trend in food culture. In Korea today, the food truck is a popular purveyor of street food, prevalent in parks and culture-art spaces.

 Food bike: It is called a food bike because food is sold from a bicycle; pedal propelled, or motorised ifa tricycle. This is new in Korea and it is planned to exhibit the first prototype in Gyeonggi-Do, and conduct a trial run.
 Pojangmacha: A pojangmacha is a small tented spot that can be on wheels or a street stall in South Korea that sells a variety of street foods, such as hotteok, gimbap, tteokbokki, sundae, dakkochi (Korean skewered chicken), odeng, mandu, and anju (dishes accompanied with drinking). In the evening, many of these establishments also serve alcoholic beverages such as soju. Pojangmacha literally means "covered wagon" in Korean.

The number of pojangmacha in Seoul has recently declined, due to people claiming the establishments are unsanitary and illegal, since many vendors operate without permits (Deborah 2018). Many pojangmacha owners however still maintain the tradition alive, selling foods such as dakbal (chicken feet) and dakkochi (skewered chicken).

Popular street food places
Traditionally street food was only seen at markets or on crowded streets, but it is now more widespread. In some regions dedicated street food streets have been built.

Busan: Kkangtong Market was the first permanent night market in South Korea. There are a lot of exotic street foods. You can taste fusion rice ball with Japanese pork and kimchi, Vietnamese deep-fried dumplings, mie goreng which means Indonesian fried noodles, and so on.

Myeong-dong: Myeong-dong is very popular for street foods. From traditional food such as chicken skewers to unique new concepts of food such as deep-fried blue crab, grilled scallops and more. The street food of Myeong-dong has become famous. Most foreign tourists who visit Myeong-dong make have their meals at the stalls. There are 200 stalls in Myeong-dong, half of which are food stalls.

Hongdae : Hongdae, also called the Mecca of Youth, has many street foods that captivate young people and tourists. Korean street foods such as tteokbokki, dakgangjeong, hotteok, fish cake, bungeoppang, rice cake skewers, and global foods such as churros, crepes, and takoyaki are located.

Noryangjin: Noryanjin's street food is formed around exit 1 of the Noryangjin (Subway line 1) where many street vendors gather. At lunch time this area is crowded with students. Recently Noryanjing has become popular with tourists after publicity on social media started by international students.

Jeonju: Jeonju Hanok Village has many street foods with Korean characteristics. There are "Bibimbap Croquet," "Bibimbap Baguette," and "Bibimbap Dumpling," which are Korean traditional foods, and local food made using food ingredients from Jeonbuk is located on Jeonju Street.

Gwangjang Market - If you love Korean cuisine, don't miss out on eating your way through Seoul's century-old Gwangjang Market. As one of the oldest continually functioning markets in all of South Korea, it's a great place to soak up the nation's traditional culture and sample its gastronomic goodies, all in one place. Of all the foods the market is famous for, mayak kimbap has to be the crowd favorite. These sushi-like, seaweed-wrapped rolls are stuffed with carrot, pickled daikon radish, and rice seasoned with sesame oil, and are as addicting as their name (which literally means ‘narcotic rice roll’) suggests. Other Gwangjang specialties include bindaetteok, a savory pancake made from ground mung beans, various vegetables and meat, and makgeolli, an icy spirit made from rice (Ladner 2018). Some food markets stay open late for those grabbing a bite from a long night but the more common one's usually tend to close either at 6pm or 11pm.

Namdaemun Market – Namdaemun Market was born around the 1400s and is considered to be Seoul's oldest market along with the largest one carrying over 10,000 different types of stalls. The Food Alley has a variety of Korean dishes to offer such as steamed corn, dakkochi (chicken skewers) jokbal (pigs’ feet) and more. Much of the food found in the area are considered to be “classics” knowing that the dishes have been around for some time. Additional things besides foods are in Namdemun Market where, Whether you're looking for jewelry, luggage, stationery, hiking gear, camera parts, or traditional handicrafts, you're sure to find what you seek, and at an affordable price (Ladner 2018)

Seoul Bamdokkaebi Night Market – The Seoul Bamdokkaebi Night Market is known to be the more international or mixed of culture area where different foods and items clash together, bringing an innovative culture together. During the night, the market provides food and festivities.(Ladner 2018) The majority of the stalls are in fact food trucks which provides unique foods such as Cuban sandwiches, tacos infused in a Korean style, steak and cups, lobster types of rolls and so much more. It is crowded and has long lines since it is in the busy areas along the Han River.

Examples of South Korean street foods

See also
 List of street foods

References